Acid trance is a genre of trance music that emerged in the early 1990s focusing on using the acid sound. The trademark sound of "acid" is produced with a Roland TB-303 by playing a sequenced melody while altering the instrument's filter cutoff frequency, resonance, envelope modulation, and accent controls. This real-time tone adjustment was not part of the instrument's original intended operation. Acid trance is the best known form of trance music in Belgium. The form was first showcased at the popular Antwerp Rave 24 in Belgium, and has created four national number one singles in the country since.

Acid trance may be considered a descendant of acid house, since the genre of trance had not yet been invented during the advent of acid house (or acidhouse).

The first volumes of Trancemaster compilations contains a few tracks in acid trance style, just as classic trance tracks. The difference is, while acid trance tracks focus more on the changing TB-303 lines, classic trance (e.g. Dance 2 Trance, Cosmic Baby, Age of Love, and Jam & Spoon) tracks are more atmospheric, they use "softer" synth-lines, often strings and other ambient music elements. The line between these two styles is quite blurred; they also emerged about the same time.

Acid trance artists are often grouped with their classical and Goa counterparts. It is not uncommon to see many of the first acid trance artists featured on Goa trance compilation albums. However, some of these artists never considered themselves part of the Goa or psychedelic scene and these compilation albums were often done by their record labels who published acid trance alongside Goa artists.

Notable labels
Attack Records
Harthouse
Le Petit Prince
Moonshine Music
Platipus Records
Rising High Records

References

https://bandcamp.com/tag/acid-trance

20th-century music genres
Psychedelic music
Trance genres